is a museum of the natural sciences in Tomioka, Gunma Prefecture, Japan.

History
The museum first opened in 1978 under its old Japanese name, after repairs to the former . In 1996, the old museum closed, and its collection was transferred, before reopening under its current name in a new building to designs by Uchii Shōzō. On 8 August 2008, the Museum received its two millionth visitor, and on 7 August 2015, its three millionth.

Publications
  (1996—)

See also

 Gunma Prefectural Museum of History
 Tomioka Silk Mill

References

External links
  Gunma Museum of Natural History
  Gunma Museum of Natural History
 Bulletin of Gunma Museum of Natural History

Tomioka, Gunma
Museums in Gunma Prefecture
Museums established in 1978
1978 establishments in Japan
Natural history museums in Japan